Callum MacLeod (born 20 January 1988) is a professional British race car driver who drives in the British G.T. Championship. He also won the 2007 British Formula Ford Championship and the 2009 European F3 Open Championship. He was born in Northampton.

Racing career highlights
Runner up in European F3 Open 2010
European F3 Open Copa Champion 2009
British Formula Ford champion 2007
Runner up in Formula Ford Festival – Duratec class 2007

Karting career highlights
Super 1 National Rotax Junior champion 2003.

Racing record

Career summary

† As he was a guest driver, MacLeod was ineligible to score points.

Complete GP3 Series results
(key) (Races in bold indicate pole position) (Races in italics indicate fastest lap)

External links
 Official website
 Callum MacLeod career statistics at Driver Database

1988 births
Living people
English racing drivers
Formula Ford drivers
British Formula Three Championship drivers
Formula BMW UK drivers
GP3 Series drivers
International GT Open drivers
24 Hours of Spa drivers
Blancpain Endurance Series drivers
British GT Championship drivers
Porsche Carrera Cup GB drivers
T-Sport drivers
Carlin racing drivers
Team West-Tec drivers
M-Sport drivers
GT4 European Series drivers